Spiranthera may refer to:
 Spiranthera (plant), a genus of plants in the family Rutaceae
 Spiranthera, a genus of plants in the family Liliaceae, synonym of Eustrephus
 Spiranthera, a genus of plants in the family Convolvulaceae, synonym of Merremia
 Spiranthera, a genus of plants in the family Pittosporaceae, synonym of Billardiera